Karl Emil Oskar Beier (29 November 1893, Vápenná – 12 May 1985, Fulda) was a German Nazi politician and SS-Sturmbannführer (Major) during the German occupation of Czechoslovakia (1938–1945). From 1940 to 1945, he was the mayor of Ostrava, Czechoslovakia.

Beier was put into place for Josef Hinner, who was deposed for being "too soft" on Czech officials. As mayor, he initiated the annexation of 12 municipalities into Ostrava (Heřmanice, Hrabová, Hrušov, Kunčice, Kunčičky, Michálkovice, Muglinov, Nová Bělá, Radvanice, Slezská Ostrava, Stará Bělá, and Výškovice). He also established the mining museum and expanded road communications. Beier wrote the book Mährish Ostrau, which was published in Prague by the SS in 1942. After the liberation of Ostrava, he was briefly replaced by Josef Lampa.

References

1893 births
1985 deaths
Nazi Party politicians
Mayors of Ostrava
SS-Sturmbannführer
People from Jeseník District
Sudeten German people